Arthur Kosowsky is a theoretical physicist and cosmologist, and chair of the Department of Physics and Astronomy at the University of Pittsburgh.

Biography 
Arthur Kosowsky received his B.S. in physics in 1989 from Washington University in St. Louis, where he was an Arthur Holly Compton Fellow. In 1994, he received his Ph.D. in physics under the supervision of Michael Turner, where he was an NSF Graduate Research Fellow and a NASA GSRP fellow. He then held positions as a Junior Fellow at Harvard University and as assistant then associate professor at Rutgers, before moving to the University of Pittsburgh, where he is a Professor and Chair of the Department of Physics and Astronomy. He was divisional associate editor for Physical Review Letters.

Koswosky was elected a fellow of the American Physical Society in 2014 for "landmark contributions to cosmology, including pioneering work on the use of CMB fluctuations for precision cosmology and pioneering work on the origin and detection of primordial gravitational waves." In addition to his theoretical research, he collaborates on observational work through the Atacama Cosmology Telescope and Simons Observatory.

References 

Living people
Year of birth missing (living people)
Washington University physicists
Washington University in St. Louis alumni
University of Chicago alumni
University of Pittsburgh faculty
American physicists
Fellows of the American Physical Society